Vladimir Vladimirovich Khomyakov (Russian: Влади́мир Влади́мирович Хомяко́в; born August 6, 1984) is a classical pianist.

Early years 
Vladimir Khomyakov was born in Kirovorgad (Ukraine) to a family of professional musicians, graduates of Odessa Conservatory. His father, Vladimir Viktorovich Khomyakov, is one of today's most prominent concert organists.

He started his music studies at the age of four with his mother Olga Donskaya. At the age of six Khomyakov began lessons at Chelyabinsk Special Music School with Lyudmila Ekimova, and has performed his first solo recital at the age of ten at Chelyabinsk Philharmonic Society.

Education 
After winning First Prize in IV Saint Petersburg Open Piano Competition in 2000, Khomyakov began his studies at the Saint Petersburg Conservatory with Alexander Sandler. He graduated in 2008 with master's degree in piano performance, chamber music and piano pedagogy. Thereafter he continued his post-graduate studies at the Moscow Conservatory with Yuri Martynov (piano department of Mikhail Voskresensky).

In 2009 Khomyakov moved to the United States to study with pianist Daniel Pollack. He got accepted into prestigious Artist Diploma program at the University of Southern California Thornton School of Music (Los Angeles), which he finished with honors, being named an outstanding graduate of the year.

In 2016 he finished Doctor of Musical Arts program at the Thornton School, in piano with Daniel Pollack and in instrumental conducting with Larry J. Livingston.

Additionally, Khomyakov supplemented his studies in numerous master-classes and educational programs, including Holland Music Sessions (Bargen, Netherlands), ISAM Academy (Michelstadt, Germany), and Summer Academy of Mozarteum University (Salzburg, Austria), where he studied with Dmitri Bashkirov. His other mentors in different years were Aleksey Nasedkin, Mikhail Voskresensky, Pavel Egorov, Yuri Rozum, Arie Vardi, Naum Shtarkman, Stewart L. Gordon.

Concert appearances 
During his years of studies Khomyakov won various prizes in international piano competitions, including Anton Rubinstein Competition (Dresden, Germany), Emil Gilels Competition (Odessa, Ukraine), Maria Canals International Music Competition (Barcelona, Spain), José Iturbi International Music Competition (Los Angeles), Hilton Head International Piano Competition (Hilton Head Island, South Carolina), Ima Hogg Competition (Houston), and others.

Khomyakov has performed as soloist with various orchestras around the world, including Houston Symphony, Dresden Philharmonic, Ningbo Symphony Orchestra, Novosibirsk Philharmonic Orchestra, Tomsk Philharmonic Orchestra, Volga Philharmonic Orchestra, Togliatti Philharmonic Orchestra, Barnaul Philharmonic Orchestra, Chelyabinsk Opera Orchestra, "Klassika" Chamber Orchestra, Voronezh State Symphony Orchestra, USC Symphony Orchestra, collaborating with renown conductors, such as Thomas Sanderling, Aziz Shokhakimov, Daniel Hege, Yaroslav Tkalenko, Cheng Hao, Anton Grishanin.

He has appeared in solo recital and chamber music in such venues as Seoul Arts Center, Flagey Studio Four (Brussels), Rimsky-Korsakov Conservatory (Saint Petersburg), Katz Philharmonic Hall and State Philharmonic Chamber Hall (Novosibirsk, Russia), Tchaikovsky Conservatory (Moscow), Semperoper (Dresden), Mozarteum Hall (Salzburg), Miller Outdoor Theatre (Houston), Zipper Hall (Los Angeles), Royce Hall (Los Angeles), Wilshire Ebell Theater (Los Angeles), Gindi Auditorium (Los Angeles), Auditorio San Pedro (Monterrey, Mexico), National Theatre of Costa Rica (San José, Costa Rica), Teatro Moderno (Grosseto, Italy), Koerner Hall (Toronto), Coughlin-Saunders Performing Arts Center (Alexandria, Louisiana), Huizhou Arts Center (Huizhou, China), Lucas Theater for the Arts (Savannah, Georgia), Palau de la Música Catalana (Barcelona), Great Hall of Samara Philharmonic (Samara, Russia), Altay Philharmonic (Barnaul, Russia), Villa Torlonia (Rome), Prokofiev Philharmonic Hall (Chelyabinsk, Russia), Katzin Concert Hall (Phoenix), Corbett Auditorium (Cincinnati), Walton Arts Center (Fayetteville, Arkansas), Brown Hall (Houston), Bashkiria Philharmonic (Ufa, Russia), German Hygiene Museum (Dresden), Pomor Philharmonic Hall (Arkhangelsk, Russia), Ordzhonikidze Palace of Culture (Magnitogorsk, Russia).

Khomyakov is currently represented by Classical Music Artists Management (Moscow - New York City).

Teaching positions 
Beginning in the fall of 2016, Khomyakov holds the position of Associate Professor at Saddleback College (Mission Viejo, California).

Since his early years of studies at the University of Southern California, he has been chosen to be an assistant to Daniel Pollack and teach weekly master-classes at the Thornton School.

Awards 
Khomyakov has won the following awards:
 2013 – Ima Hogg Competition (USA) – 2nd prize and silver medal
 2013 – Bell T. Ritchie Award (USA) – 1st place
 2011 – Susan Torres Award (USA) – 1st place
 2010 – Hilton Head International Piano Competition (USA) – Medalist
 2010 – José Iturbi International Music Competition (USA) – Audience Choice award
 2009 – José Iturbi International Music Competition (USA) – 4th place and Audience Choice award
 2009 – Maria Canals International Music Competition (Spain) – 4th place
 2008 – Siegfried Weishaupt International Piano Competition (Germany) – 1st prize
 2006 – Emil Gilels International Piano Competition (Ukraine) – Diploma and Best Transcription Performance prize
 2005 – Anton Rubinstein Competition (Germany) – 3rd prize and Audience prize
 2000 – IV Saint Petersburg Open Piano Competition (Russia) – 1st prize

Recordings 
 2022 – Scratch: Scriabin, Rachmaninoff, Tchaikovsky, solo album
 2021 – Romance, solo album
 2018 – Schumann – Liszt – Prokofiev, solo album

References

External links 
 
Vladimir Khomyakov on iTunes
 Classical Music Artists Management website
 USC Thornton School of Music website
 Moscow Conservatory website
 Saint Petersburg Conservatory website

1984 births
Living people
Contemporary classical music performers
American classical pianists
Male classical pianists
Russian classical pianists